Coati Mundi may refer to:

 Coatimundi (sometimes Coati Mundi), or coati, two genera of mammals of the family Procyonidae native to South America, Central America, Mexico, and the southwestern United States
White-nosed coati, or coatimundi, the North American species of coati
 Coati Mundi (musician), the stage name of American musician Andy Hernandez (b. 1950)

See also
Caput Mundi, a Latin phrase for "capital of the world"